Jonathan Oluwadara Amon (born April 30, 1999) is an American soccer player who plays as a left winger.

Youth career
Amon played three seasons with the U.S. Soccer Development Academy in Charleston, South Carolina, before getting selected to the U.S. Soccer U15 National Team Camp in 2014. Amon found his way to FC Nordsjaelland by virtue of a serendipitous chain of events that began with him being invited to attend a camp in Denmark at the invitation of scout Kenn Schmidt Nielsen of the Global Elite FC / Global Football School USA, Inc. While in Denmark, Scout Nielsen took him to tryouts at two clubs (Brøndby IF and FC Nordsjælland) and he grew to like the student and training environment at the KIES School, where the camp was held, and Scout Kenn helped him to enroll KIES. Soon after, Søren Krogh (teacher at Kies and assistant coach with FC Nordsjælland) offered Amon the opportunity to join FC Nordsjælland academy U17 team. In May 2017, Amon signed his first professional contract with FCN.

Club career

FC Nordsjælland
Amon made his professional debut on November 4, 2017, in a tie against Lyngby. He replaced Ernest Asante at the game's 84th minute. On November 26, 2017, Amon started the match against AC Horsens. He played 80 minutes and scored his first goal as a professional player.

International career
Amon was called up in January 2018 to the United States under-20 side for a training camp in Florida.

On November 4, 2018, Amon made his senior team debut with the national team in a friendly against Peru.

Career statistics

Personal life
Amon's father is from Nigeria and emigrated to the United States at a young age to play soccer at the high school level. Amon has three brothers and one sister. His older brother, Joseph Amon, also played soccer and was named to the U.S. squad for the 2011 FIFA U-17 World Cup.

References

External links
 
 Top Drawer Soccer Profile
 SuperStats Profile

1999 births
Living people
American expatriate soccer players
American sportspeople of Nigerian descent
American soccer players
Association football midfielders
Expatriate men's footballers in Denmark
Danish Superliga players
FC Nordsjælland players
People from Summerville, South Carolina
Soccer players from South Carolina
United States men's international soccer players
American expatriate sportspeople in Denmark
United States men's under-20 international soccer players